Crewe Town Council is a parish council covering the town of Crewe in England. It comprises six wards, electing 20 councillors between them.
The Council is based at 1 Chantry Court, Crewe where it generally holds its committee meetings. Full Council meetings are normally held at the Salvation Army. 

The first elections were held on 4 April 2013, and resulted in the Labour Party winning all 20 seats on the council, this was repeated in the 2015 and 2019 local elections.

History

2013 Election
The first election for the newly established Crewe Town Council took place on 4 April 2013.
The results were:

References

External links
 Page not found
 Crewe Town Council – A Voice For Crewe

Crewe
Town Councils in Cheshire
Local precepting authorities in England